Christ the King Church is a Roman Catholic Parish church in Bao'an District, Shenzhen, Guangdong, China. It was founded and built in November 2010.

History
Christ the King Church was founded and built in November 2010.

Architecture
There is a statue of Jesus at the top of the church, and he opened his arms as if to welcome the believers.

Parish
The church has three Sunday Masses. One is at 8:00pm on Saturday evening, at 9:00am Sunday morning and 3:00pm on Sunday afternoon. There are weekday Masses at 7:00am from Monday to Saturday.

Transportation
 Take subway Line 5 (Huanzhong Line) to get off at Xingdong Station. Getting out from Exit C and walk  to reach the church.

References

Further reading

 
 

Roman Catholic churches in Guangdong
Churches in Shenzhen
Roman Catholic churches completed in 2010
21st-century Roman Catholic church buildings in China
Gothic Revival church buildings in China
Tourist attractions in Shenzhen
2010 establishments in China